What Love Will Do is a 1921 American silent drama film directed by William K. Howard and starring Edna Murphy, Johnnie Walker and Barbara Tennant.

Cast
 Edna Murphy as 	Mary Douglas
 Johnnie Walker as Johnny Rowan
 Glen Cavender as Abner Rowan
 Barbara Tennant as Goldie Rowan
 Richard Tucker as 	Herbert Dawson
 Edwin B. Tilton as Reverend Douglas

References

Bibliography
 Connelly, Robert B. The Silents: Silent Feature Films, 1910-36, Volume 40, Issue 2. December Press, 1998.
 Munden, Kenneth White. The American Film Institute Catalog of Motion Pictures Produced in the United States, Part 1. University of California Press, 1997.
 Solomon, Aubrey. The Fox Film Corporation, 1915-1935: A History and Filmography. McFarland, 2011.

External links
 

1921 films
1921 drama films
1920s English-language films
American silent feature films
Silent American drama films
American black-and-white films
Fox Film films
Films directed by William K. Howard
1920s American films